Blooded is a novel written by Christopher Golden and Nancy Holder,  based on the U.S. television series Buffy the Vampire Slayer.

Plot summary

Chirayoju, an ancient Chinese vampire, and Sanno, a Japanese Mountain King, have been fighting for years. Their spirits were imprisoned in a sword by a curse. The sword arrives in Sunnydale and while viewing the Japanese exhibit at the museum Willow becomes possessed by the spirit of Chirayoju and Xander, later on, becomes possessed by the spirit of Sanno. Buffy must figure out a way to stop the two spirits without killing her own friends. During the final battle, when the fight takes an ugly turn, Buffy must also keep her own spirit alive.

References

External links

Reviews
Nika-summers.com - Review of this book by Nika Summers
Shadowcat.name - Review of this book

1998 novels
Books based on Buffy the Vampire Slayer
Pocket Books books